was a Japanese actor. He was known for playing the role of Tokugawa Mitsukuni on the television jidaigeki series Mito Kōmon. Sano died on 28 June 2022, at the age of 96.

Selected filmography

Film
Listen to the Voices of the Sea (1950)
Season of the Sun (1956)
Black River (1957)
Fires on the Plain (1959)
Ballad of the Cart (1959)
Burari Bura-bura Monogatari (1962)Carmen from Kawachi (1966)Fighting Elegy (1966)Yogiri yo Kon'yamo Arigatō (1967)The Sands of Kurobe (1968)Apart from Life (1970)The Last Samurai (1974)Cops vs. Thugs (1976)Tora-san's Sunrise and Sunset (1976)THe Incident (1978)NIchiren (1979)Kagero-za (1981)The Funeral (1984)Ooinaru Kan (1998)

TelevisionTen to Chi to (1969)Katsu Kaishū (1974)Kaze to Kumo to Niji to (1976)Mito Kōmon'' (1993–2000) as Mito Mitsukuni

References

External links

1925 births
2022 deaths
20th-century Japanese male actors
Japanese male film actors
Japanese male stage actors
Japanese male television actors
Recipients of the Order of the Sacred Treasure, 4th class
Male actors from Yokohama